Goya en Burdeos (English: Goya in Bordeaux) is a 1999 Spanish historical drama film written and directed  by Carlos Saura about the life of Francisco  Goya, the Spanish painter.

Plot
The title refers to Goya's move at the end of his life to France from where he looks back at his career from the late 18th century onwards. The painter is played by two actors, as a young and an old man. Other characters include the painter's muse, the Duchess of Alba. Some people have assumed that Goya and the Duchess were lovers, and the film follows this interpretation.

Awards
 5 awards at the 14th Goya Awards including Best Actor (Francisco Rabal)
 2 Prizes at Montréal World Film Festival
 European Film Awards: Best Cinematographer (Vittorio Storaro)
 Satellite Awards Best Foreign Film nominee

Cast
Incomplete
Francisco Rabal as Goya
José Coronado as Goya (young)
Dafne Fernández as Rosario
Eulalia Ramón as Leocadia
Maribel Verdú as María del Pilar Teresa Cayetana de Silva y Álvarez de Toledo, 13th Duchess of Alba
Joaquín Climent as Moratín
Cristina Espinosa as Pepita Tudó
José María Pou as Manuel de Godoy
Saturnino García as Cura y San Antonio
Carlos Hipólito as Juan Meléndez Valdés
Emilio Gutiérrez Caba as José de la Cruz

References

External links 
 

1999 films
1990s Spanish-language films
1990s historical drama films
Spanish historical drama films
Films set in the 18th century
Films set in the 19th century
Films directed by Carlos Saura
Biographical films about painters
Films set in Spain
Films set in Bordeaux
Cultural depictions of Francisco Goya
Films scored by Roque Baños
1999 drama films
Sony Pictures Classics films
1990s Spanish films